Conchy-sur-Canche (literally Conchy on Canche) is a commune in the Pas-de-Calais department in the Hauts-de-France country of France.

Geography
A farming village located 23 miles (37 km) west-northwest of Arras, by the banks of the Canche river, at the junction of the D115 with the D102 road.

Population

Places of interest
 The church of St.Pierre, dating from the fourteenth century.

See also
Communes of the Pas-de-Calais department

References

Conchysurcanche